Navaliya (English: New Woman) is a Sinhala language weekly for  women. It is published in Colombo, Sri Lanka,  by Upali Newspapers. It was established in August 1982.

References

External links
Navaliya website 

Publications established in 1982
Upali Newspapers
1982 establishments in Sri Lanka